HMS Defiance was a 74-gun third rate ship of the line of the Royal Navy, built by Randall and Co., at Rotherhithe on the River Thames, and launched on 10 December 1783.

History
She was commissioned by Lt M.T. Hewitt for Captain George Keppel. He sailed her with the Channel Fleet during September and October 1796 at which time it was reported that,
Her qualifications are described as having been of a very superior order. She stowed her provisions well, and when sailing with the Channel fleet in September and October, 1796, beat all the line of battle ships, and kept pace with the frigates. " Upon a wind," Rays
the Master's report, " spared them" (the line of battle ships) " main-sail and top-gallant sails, and sailing two or three points free or before the wind, beat them still more." At this time the Defiance's draught of water forward was 20 feet 5 inches; aft, 22 feet 5 inches; height of the midship port, 5 feet 8 inches. Her masts were stayed thus: "foremast nearly upright, main and mizenmasts rake aft."

Her crew mutinied three times, firstly in October 1795, when she was under the command of Captain Sir George Home. He initially had to release the ringleaders when the ratings attempted to storm the officer's quarters, but later these and additional mutineers were put in irons when,
...in the afternoon a strong party of the 7th, or South Fencible regiment, and several officers, arrived on board. On the 20th, at 10 a.m., a general muster of the ship's company was made, and the eight men, previously in irons, together with three more, were placed in confinement, and others were subsequently added. A few days afterwards the South Fencibles were relieved by a detachment of the 134th Regt., in number 132, under Lieut.-Colonel Baillie, and with these the Defiance sailed from Leith and returned to the Nore.
The stationing of the Army troops was required because the ship sailed without its contingent of 60 Marines, which later embarked at Sheerness.

On 23 March 1796 Captain Theophilus Jones took command.

The crew of the Defiance mutinied for a second time in 1797 during the Spithead mutiny.

Her ship's company mutinied again in 1798 during the rising of the United Irishmen. Eleven men were hanged and ten transported for life in the penal colony of New South Wales.

Her next Captain was Thomas Revell Shivers, who took command on 27 February 1797 at Torbay. In 1798, some of her crew were court-martialed for mutiny.

In the summer of 1800, Defiance was attached to the squadron under Sir Alan Gardner, stationed off the Black Rocks. On 24 December 1800, Capt. Richard Retallick superseded Capt. Shivers, Defiance being selected for the flagship of Rear Admiral Sir Thomas Graves.

She fought at the Battle of Copenhagen on 2 April 1801, as the flagship of Rear Admiral Thomas Graves, with Captain Retallick commanding. The station in the line occupied in the battle was abreast of the Crown battery, which mounted thirty-six heavy guns, and was provided with a furnace for heating shot. Owing to the mishaps that kept , Russell, and Agamemnon from taking up their assigned stations, the Defiance became exposed to a severe cross fire, from which she suffered very severe damage. In furtherance of the designs of Lord Nelson, when Sir Hyde
Parker made the signal to discontinue the action, which Nelson would not see, Rear-Admiral Graves in the Defiance repeated the signal at the lee maintopsail yardarm, from whence it could not be seen on board the Elephant. The Defiance continued firing until 3h. 15m. p.m., when the action ceased ; and her spring being cut and sail made, she dropped out of the station she had occupied. Shortly afterwards, the Defiance grounded, and was with difficulty hove off, after starting thirty butts of water. During the action the ship was frequently set on fire by the hot 42-pound shot fired from the batteries, and her damages were consequently serious. Her loss in killed and wounded was as follows Lieutenant George Gray*, Matthew Cobb, pilot, 17 seamen, 3 marines, and 2 soldiers, killed; and the boatswain Lewis Patterson, James Galloway, Midshipman, Harry Niblett, Captain's Clerk, — Stephenson, pilot, 35 seamen, 5 marines, and 7 soldiers, wounded: total, 24 killed, and 51 wounded.

Finnisterre and Trafalgar
She also participated in the Battle of Cape Finisterre on 22 July 1805, and the Battle of Trafalgar on 21 October, whilst under the command of Captain Philip Charles Durham, who claimed that "she was the fastest 74 gun ship in the British fleet".

At Trafalgar the Defiance captured the Spanish San Juan Nepomuceno, and the French Aigle (although the following day the French crew managed to recapture the Aigle from the British prize crew shortly before she was wrecked during the storm of 23 October).

Prior to the boarding of the Aigle by a full boarding party from the Defiance,  James "Jack" Spratt dived into the sea from Defiance, swimming with a cutlass between his teeth to the Aigle he climbed in through a stern window and boarded her single handed. He found his way to the French poop deck and threw himself on the French crew, one man against several hundred. In the melee he killed two French seamen, and was grappling with a third when he fell from the poop deck to the main deck, killing his opponent but injuring himself badly. He was saved by the timely arrival of a full boarding party from Defiance.

During the battle of Trafalgar Defiance and sustained casualties of 57 killed, and 153 wounded.

Final service and fate
In 1809, she took part in the Battle of Les Sables-d'Olonne.

Lloyd's List reported in February 1809 that the man-of-war Defiance had sent the French cutter Prudente into Plymouth.

Fate
After serving as a prison ship at Chatham from 1813, she was broken up in 1817.

Captains
1794 Captain George Keppel
1795 Captain Sir George Home, 7th Baronet
1796 Captain Theophilus Jones
1799 Captain T.R. Shivers
1801 Captain R. Retalick
1805 Captain Philip Charles Durham
1807 Captain Henry Hotham
1811 Captain Richard Raggett

Trafalgar Wood Project

Citations and notes

References

 Lavery, Brian (2003) The Ship of the Line - Volume 1: The development of the battlefleet 1650-1850. Conway Maritime Press. .

Further reading
 Trafalgar Captain: Durham of the Defiance, Hilary L. Rubinstein, Tempus Publishing Ltd, 2005,

External links
 
 Ships of the World
 Trafalgar Wood Project

Ships of the line of the Royal Navy
Elizabeth-class ships of the line
Ships built in Rotherhithe
1783 ships
Royal Navy mutinies